Helenodora is an extinct basal onychophoran or lobopodian genus known from the Carboniferous Carbondale Formation of Illinois.  The only known species described is H. inopinata. The ecology of this animal is not well known, but it is thought that it may have lived on land and/or underwater.

References

External links 
 

Onychophorans of temperate America
Onychophoran genera
Prehistoric onychophorans
Prehistoric protostome genera
Carboniferous invertebrates
Carboniferous United States
Fossils of the United States
Fossil taxa described in 1980